The 2018 Middle East respiratory syndrome outbreak was a set of infections of Middle East respiratory syndrome (MERS-CoV). The cases were most numerous in, and are believed to have originated from, Saudi Arabia.

250 cases of MERS were recorded in 2017, and 249 in 2016. In 2018, there was an early surge in cases, with 21 confirmed cases in February. However, over the whole year, cases were down compared to previous years, with 147 recorded cases.

MERS-CoV 

The syndrome originates in countries on the Arabian peninsula, and there is a low general risk to any travelers. Symptoms usually appear 2 to 14 days after exposure, and include fever, cough, shortness of breath and difficulty breathing.

Annual summaries
Total laboratory-confirmed cases of MERS world-wide per year were as follows:

Background of cases 
On 18 June 2018, the World Health Organization (WHO) reported that there were 75 laboratory-confirmed MERS cases in Saudi Arabia. The first observed case outside of the Middle East was diagnosed on 23 August 2018 in the United Kingdom, being the first case in 5 years in the country. A second case was detected on 8 September 2018 of a South Korean man who was traveling from the Middle East, being the first diagnosis in that country since the 2015 outbreak. There were also hundreds of suspected cases in the United States and other parts of the world, most of which were eventually diagnosed as not being MERS infections.

Full year totals were as follows:

Response 
The Ministry of Health in the Republic of Korea monitored at least 21 individuals who were in close contact with the confirmed case, and placed all identified close contacts in quarantine at their homes.

World Health Organization 
The confirmed case in Korea did not change the World Health Organization (WHO) overall global risk assessment for the disease, and WHO also stated that any additional confirmed cases would also not change the risk, which was deemed as low. However, it does recommend countries to continue to monitor potential cases and to carefully record any unusual patterns.

European Centre for Disease Prevention and Control 
After the confirmed case in the United Kingdom, the ECDC repeated their risk assessment that close contacts of confirmed cases must be monitored for symptoms for at least 14 days after the last exposure. The organization also repeated that cases of the syndrome were not unexpected and had been observed in Europe before, and the risk of transmission to the general population from the confirmed case was extremely low.

See also
 COVID-19 pandemic

References 

Middle East respiratory syndrome outbreak
MERS
Middle East respiratory syndrome outbreak
Middle East respiratory syndrome outbreak
Disease outbreaks in Saudi Arabia
2018 disease outbreaks